James Moss Stoney (February 26, 1888 – July 19, 1965) was a college football player and reverend, once Bishop of New Mexico. Stoney attended Sewanee: The University of the South, where he was an All-Southern guard for the football team. He was later an assistant coach for The Citadel. Stoney was rector of Grace Episcopal Church in Anniston, Alabama, from 1921 to 1942.

References

External links

American football guards
All-Southern college football players
Sewanee Tigers football players
The Citadel Bulldogs football coaches
1888 births
Players of American football from Albuquerque, New Mexico
1965 deaths
Players of American football from South Carolina